Nikola Olivieri (born 11 January 1987) is an Italian footballer.

Biography
Olivieri spent entire professional career in Italian Lega Pro. After the bankruptcy of Fermana, he left for Sambenedettese. In January 2008 Olivieri was swapped with Axel Vicentini. After the bankruptcy of Sambenedettese, Olivieri left for Cosenza. On 31 January 2011 his contract was terminated and Olivieri left for Casale.

Amateur
In November 2011 Olivieri left for Maceratese of Eccellenza Marche.

International career
Olivieri was selected to 2006 Trofeo Dossena at the end of 2005–06 season for Italy U20 Serie C team.
He scored a goal as a substitute against Hungary in 2006–07 Mirop Cup on 15 November 2006, a 1–1 draw. He also played against Belgium in November 2006. He was in the losing finalists in 2007 Serie C Quadrangular Tournament for U20 Serie C. Olivieri also played the match against Wales and England C in 2007–09 International Challenge Trophy. Olivieri also selected to 2008 Trofeo Dossena in June 2008. Olivieri represented Serie C1/B in 2008 Serie C under-21 Tournament in January 2008. Olivieri also played the match 2–2 draw with Italy under-21 Serie B representative team.

References

External links
 Football.it Profile 
 

Italian footballers
Fermana F.C. players
A.S. Sambenedettese players
Delfino Pescara 1936 players
Cosenza Calcio players
Casale F.B.C. players
A.S.D. Città di Giulianova 1924 players
U.S.D. Sestri Levante 1919 players
F.C. Grosseto S.S.D. players
Imolese Calcio 1919 players
S.S.D. Sanremese Calcio players
A.C. Tuttocuoio 1957 San Miniato players
Serie C players
Serie D players
Association football midfielders
Sportspeople from the Province of Teramo
1987 births
Living people
Vigevano Calcio players
Footballers from Abruzzo